Kenneth William Dow (November 18, 1917 – November 17, 1988) was an American football fullback in the National Football League. He played in two games for the Washington Redskins in 1941.  He played college football at Oregon State University and was drafted in the sixteenth round of the 1941 NFL Draft.

References

1917 births
1988 deaths
American football running backs
Oregon State Beavers football players
Washington Redskins players
People from Ephrata, Washington
Players of American football from Washington (state)